Vladimir Kokol (born 3 January 1972) is a retired Slovenian footballer who played as a midfielder.

Kokol was capped 12 times and scored 1 goal for the Slovenian national team between 1994 and 1997.

References

External links

Vladimir Kokol at ÖFB 

1972 births
Living people
Sportspeople from Maribor
Slovenian footballers
Association football midfielders
NK Železničar Maribor players
NK Mura players
NK Rudar Velenje players
NK Slaven Belupo players
NK Maribor players
NK Olimpija Ljubljana (1945–2005) players
Hapoel Nof HaGalil F.C. players
ND Mura 05 players
Slovenian PrvaLiga players
Croatian Football League players
Israeli Premier League players
Slovenian Second League players
Slovenian expatriate footballers
Slovenian expatriate sportspeople in Croatia
Expatriate footballers in Croatia
Slovenian expatriate sportspeople in Israel
Expatriate footballers in Israel
Slovenian expatriate sportspeople in Austria
Expatriate footballers in Austria
Slovenia international footballers
Slovenian football managers